Malvern Wells railway station was a station on the Worcester and Hereford section of the Great Western Railway at Lower Wyche, between Great Malvern and Colwall.  On timetables it was listed as Malvern Wells GW to distinguish it from the nearby Midland Railway station which later became known as Malvern Hanley Road.

The station closed in 1965, but the signal box here remains open as it controls the line towards , which becomes single track at this point prior to passing through the tunnels at Colwall and Ledbury. Trains terminating at Great Malvern also run here to reverse before returning east.

References

Further reading

Disused railway stations in Worcestershire
Malvern, Worcestershire
Former Great Western Railway stations
Railway stations in Great Britain opened in 1860
Railway stations in Great Britain closed in 1861
Railway stations in Great Britain opened in 1864
Railway stations in Great Britain closed in 1965
Beeching closures in England
1860 establishments in England
1965 disestablishments in England